Pseudomulciber salomonum is a species of beetle in the family Cerambycidae, and the only species in the genus Pseudomulciber. It was described by Breuning in 1961.

References

Homonoeini
Beetles described in 1961